Lady in Black may refer to:


Films
 The Lady in Black (1920 film), a silent German film
 The Lady in Black (1928 film), a silent German film
 The Lady in Black (1958 film), a Swedish film
 The Lady in Black (1951 film), a West German film
 Ladies in Black (film), a 2018 Australian film by Bruce Beresford

Music
 Lady in Black, a 1994 album by Uriah Heep
 "Lady in Black" (Uriah Heep song), 1971
 "Lady in Black" (Bad Boys Blue song), 1989
 A song from the Mercyful Fate album Time

Other uses
 A cultivar name of the flower Symphyotrichum lateriflorum, a species of Aster
 A nickname for the Darlington Raceway, a NASCAR auto racing track in South Carolina, United States
 The Lady in Black, a ghost on Georges Island
 Ladies in Black, a 2015 Australian musical by Tim Finn and Carolyn Burns

See also
 The Woman in Black (disambiguation)